Solid is the fifth studio album by German  heavy metal band U.D.O. It is the first in six years, when frontman Udo Dirkschneider put the band on hiatus and reunited with Accept. Accept's drummer Stefan Kaufmann joined U.D.O. as a guitar player on this album. Guitarists Fitty Weinhold and Jürgen Graf from Bullet were hired as new members.

The album was recorded and mixed at Roxx Studios in Pulheim.

Track listing

Personnel
Udo Dirkschneider – vocals, producer
Stefan Kaufmann – guitar, producer, engineer, mixing
Jürgen Graf – guitar
Fitty Wienhold – bass guitar
Stefan Schwarzmann – drums

Production
Manfred Melchior – mastering
Jens Rosendahl – photography
Andreas Marschall – cover art

References

1997 albums
U.D.O. albums
GUN Records albums